The Singles was the first compilation album to be released by Soft Cell. The album was issued on vinyl, cassette and CD in 1986 and features all their singles, from the albums Non-Stop Erotic Cabaret, Non-Stop Ecstatic Dancing, The Art of Falling Apart and This Last Night in Sodom, with the exception of 'A Man Can Get Lost' (Original UK AA side to 'Memorabilia') & 'Barriers' (Original UK AA side to Numbers') . The CD booklet included a November 1986 essay by Tony Mitchell.

Track listing
All songs written by Marc Almond and David Ball except where noted.

"Memorabilia" - 4:50 Non-album single
"Tainted Love" (Ed Cobb) - 2:40 from Non-Stop Erotic Cabaret
"Bedsitter" - 3:36 from Non-Stop Erotic Cabaret
"Say Hello, Wave Goodbye" - 5:25 from Non-Stop Erotic Cabaret
"Torch" - 4:08 Non-album single
"Loving You, Hating Me" - 4:19 from The Art of Falling Apart
"What?" (H.B. Barnum) - 4:34 from Non Stop Ecstatic Dancing
"Where the Heart Is" - 4:32 from The Art of Falling Apart
"Numbers" - 4:56 from The Art of Falling Apart
"Soul Inside" - 4:29 from This Last Night in Sodom
"Down in the Subway" (Jack Hammer) - 3:26 from This Last Night in Sodom

Notes
"Loving You, Hating Me" was never actually released in the UK as a single and only saw a promo release in the USA & Canada.

References

External links

Soft Cell albums
1986 compilation albums